Charles Sillem Lidderdale (September 28, 1830, St.Petersburg - June 7, 1895, London) was a British artist whose work often focused on portraits of young women in outdoor settings.

Selected paintings

1830 births
1895 deaths
19th-century British painters
British male painters
19th-century British male artists